Against (styled as AgainST) were an American crossover thrash band, formed in 2006 for the Welcome 2 Venice compilation by singer-songwriter Dan Clements, original Suicidal Tendencies members Grant Estes, Louiche Mayorga and Amery Smith and former No Mercy vocalist Kevin Guercio.

History
In 2006, Louiche Mayorga started the compilation album project Welcome 2 Venice with other bands from Venice, California. Just a few days later he met by chance with Grant Estes and Amery Smith, he told them about the project and they instantaneously accepted to join it. Mayorga recorded some tapes and sent them to Dan Clements (Excel founding member and frontman) who called him that same night to form new band together. With the line-up complete, the band was called Against. In May 2006, they made two shows at The Good Hurt Club in Venice, both concerts were benefits to help launch the compilation album Welcome 2 Venice (disc which continues the previous compilation released in 1985, with songs by their original bands). At the time of going to the studio, Mayorga recruited Kevin Guercio (original No Mercy singer) as a second vocalist for the group. They recorded two tracks for Welcome 2 Venice: "Camarillo" (with Clements) and "Roll the Dice" (with Guercio). The entire recording, release and distribution was conducted by Louiche Mayorga's independent label, Built on an Ounce. After the release of the album, there were rumors about a possible Excel reunion, however Clements said he had no intentions of reforming the band, and did not want anyone to take Against as a return of the group.

Members
 Dan Clements – lead vocals  
 Kevin Guercio – lead vocals  
 Grant Estes – guitar  
 Louiche Mayorga – bass  
 Amery Smith – drums

Discography

References

External links
Against MySpace
Welcome 2 Venice MySpace
Welcome 2 Venice CD MySpace

Musical groups established in 2006
Musical groups disestablished in 2006
Metalcore musical groups from California
Punk rock groups from California
Thrash metal musical groups from California